Alfred Mazurich (born 5 December 2003) is a Belarusian professional footballer who plays for Neman Grodno.

References

External links 
 
 

2003 births
Living people
Belarusian footballers
Association football midfielders
FC Neman Grodno players